Lars and the Real Girl is a 2007 romantic comedy-drama film written by Nancy Oliver and directed by Craig Gillespie. It stars Ryan Gosling, Emily Mortimer, Paul Schneider, Kelli Garner, and Patricia Clarkson. The film follows Lars (Gosling), a kind-hearted but socially awkward young man who develops a romantic yet nonsexual relationship with an anatomically correct sex doll, a RealDoll named Bianca.

Though a commercial failure, Lars and the Real Girl was critically acclaimed, receiving an Academy Award nomination for Best Original Screenplay, while Gosling received nominations for the Golden Globe Award for Best Actor – Motion Picture Musical or Comedy and the Screen Actors Guild Award for Outstanding Performance by a Male Actor in a Leading Role.

Plot
Lars Lindstrom lives a secluded life in a small Wisconsin town. His mother died when he was born, causing his grief-stricken father to have been a distant parent to Lars and his older brother, Gus. Gus left town as soon as he could support himself, returning only to inherit his half of the household when their father died. As an awkward adult, Lars feels guilt that his birth coincides with his mother's death and he seeks to resolve these conflicting feeling of love and loss.

The inheritance has been divided between the brothers: Lars lives in the converted garage, while Gus and his pregnant wife Karin live in the house proper. Lars is pathologically shy; interacting with or relating to his family or co-workers is very difficult for him. A colleague at his office job, Margo, likes him, but Lars is impervious to Margo’s attempts to be friendly.

One evening, Lars happily announces to Gus and Karin that he has a visitor whom he met online, a wheelchair-mobile missionary of Brazilian and Danish descent named Bianca. The pair are startled to discover that Bianca is actually a lifelike doll that Lars ordered from an adult website. Lars treats the doll as a live human being, asking if Bianca can stay in Gus and Karin's guest room, as she and Lars are religious and do not want scandal about their relationship. Gus and Karin play along with Lars’ delusion, but, concerned about his mental health, also convince Lars to take Bianca with him to Dagmar, a family doctor who is also a psychologist. While Dagmar diagnoses Bianca with low blood pressure, she urges Lars to come in with Bianca for weekly treatments, during which Dagmar will attempt to analyze Lars and get to the root of his behavior. Dagmar explains to Gus and Karin that Lars’ delusion is a manifestation of an underlying problem that needs to be addressed, and that they need to assist with Lars' therapy by continuing to treat Bianca as if she was real. During this time, Margo has begun to date another co-worker, which silently bothers Lars.

Eventually, Lars introduces Bianca as his girlfriend to his co-workers and various townspeople. Sympathetic to Lars, the town inhabitants react to the doll as if she were real, and Bianca soon finds herself involved in volunteer programs, getting a makeover from the local beautician, and working part-time as a model in a clothing store. Due to the town’s acceptance of Bianca, Lars finds himself interacting more with people. When Margo reveals to Lars she has broken up with her boyfriend, Lars agrees to go bowling with her while Bianca attends a school board meeting. The two spend a pleasant evening, though Lars is quick to remind Margo he could never cheat on Bianca. She replies she would never expect that of him and tells him she hopes one day to find a man as faithful as him.

Lars also asks Gus when he knew he had become a man and what being a man means. Gus says he knew it when he began doing the right things for the right reasons, even when it hurt. Gus gives several examples, including their father keeping them and taking care of them, even though he didn't know how. Gus says that he never should have left Lars alone with their father, and he apologizes for being selfish. Their conversation seems to reach Lars and his dependence on Bianca begins to shift.

One morning, Lars discovers Bianca is unresponsive, and she's rushed to the hospital by ambulance. Her prognosis isn't good, and Lars announces Bianca would like to be brought home. News of her illness spreads through town, and everyone whose life has been touched by Bianca brings flowers or food to the Lindstrom home. Gus and Karin suggest Lars and Bianca join them for a visit to the lake. When Gus and Karin make their way back from the hike, they discover a despondent Lars in the lake with a “dying” Bianca, after Lars gave her a farewell kiss. The relationship was never sexual, and was Lars' way to let go of his guilt for his mother's (loved one's) death.

Bianca is given a full-fledged funeral that is well-attended by the townspeople. After Bianca is buried, Lars and Margo linger at the gravesite. Having come to terms with past traumas, ready to accept adult responsibilities, and filled with newfound self-confidence, Lars asks Margo if she would like to take a walk with him, which she happily accepts.

Mythical background 
The film Lars and the Real Girl has ties to Ovid’s story of Pygmalion. Lars plays the modern version of Pygmalion in this romantic comedy adaptation. 

Pygmalion is a story of unusual love as Pygmalion falls in love with his statue of a beautiful ivory woman. To Pygmalion, this statue is real, “He often felt the statue with his hands, to see if it was flesh, or ivory still, and then no longer admitted it was ivory”. Similarly, Lars sees Bianca as a real girl; he holds conversations with her, changes her clothes, puts her to sleep and washes her. Both Lars and Pygmalion find this false connection out of love and loneliness. 

For Lars, the love is romantic and fulfills a role in his life that was missing, while Pygmalion’s is both romantic and sexual. Lars and Pygmalion’s stories come to a happy end when both realize what they want in life and put forth the work to accomplish this, though the difference is that Pygmalion's love actually makes the statue into a living woman, Galatea, while Lars must let Bianca "die" and move on.

Cast

Production
In The Real Story of Lars and the Real Girl, a special feature on the DVD release of the film, screenwriter Nancy Oliver reveals the inspiration for her script was an actual website, RealDoll.com, which is featured prominently in the film. While researching "weird websites" for an article, Oliver found RealDoll.com. She wrote the script in 2002. The script was the third-ranked screenplay in The Black List in 2005.

The film, set in the American state of Wisconsin, was filmed with a US$12 million budget on location in Alton, Elora, King Township, Toronto, Uxbridge, and Whitevale, all located in the Canadian province of Ontario.
Film credits include Rosalie MacKintosh as "Bianca wrangler" and Karly Bowen as "assistant Bianca wrangler."

Release
The film premiered at the Toronto International Film Festival in September 9, 2007 before going into limited release in the U.S. on October 12, 2007. It initially opened on seven screens in New York City, New York; and Los Angeles, California, and earned $90,418 on its opening weekend. It later expanded to 321 theaters and remained in release for 147 days, earning $5,972,884 domestically and $5,320,639 in other markets for a worldwide box-office total of $11,293,663.
 
The film was featured at the Austin Film Festival, the Heartland Film Festival, the Torino Film Festival, the Glasgow Film Festival, and the Las Palmas de Gran Canaria International Film Festival.

Critical reception
Lars and the Real Girl received positive reviews from critics, with Gosling's performance being universally acclaimed. On the review aggregator Rotten Tomatoes, the film has a "Certified Fresh" score of 81%, based on reviews from 138 critics, and an average rating of 7.10/10. The site's critical consensus states, "Lars and the Real Girl could've so easily been a one-joke movie. But the talented cast, a great script, and direction never condescend to its character or the audience." On Metacritic, the film has a weighted average score of 70 out of 100, based on 32 reviews.

Roger Ebert of the Chicago Sun-Times awarded the film three and a half stars out of four and observed, "The film wisely never goes for even one moment that could be interpreted as smutty or mocking. There are so many ways [it] could have gone wrong that one of the film's fascinations is how adroitly it sidesteps them. Its weapon is absolute sincerity. It has a kind of purity to it."

Mick LaSalle of the San Francisco Chronicle called the film "a gentle comedy, offbeat but never cute, never lewd and never going for shortcut laughs that might diminish character."

Manohla Dargis of The New York Times said, "American self-nostalgia is a dependable racket, and if the filmmakers had pushed into the realm of nervous truth, had given Lars and the town folk sustained shadows, not just cute tics and teary moments, it might have worked. Instead the film is palatable audience bait of average accomplishment that superficially recalls the plain style of Alexander Payne, but without any of the lacerating edges or moral ambiguity."

Kenneth Turan of the Los Angeles Times described it as "the sweetest, most innocent, most completely enjoyable film around," "a film whose daring and delicate blend of apparent irreconcilables will sweep you off your feet if you're not careful. The creators of this film were fiercely determined not to go so much as a millimeter over the line into sentiment, tawdriness or mockery. It's the rare film that is the best possible version of itself, but Lars fits that bill."

Lou Lumenick of the New York Post awarded the film three out of four stars, calling it "an offbeat comedy that plays as if Preston Sturges came back to life and collaborated with the Coen Brothers on an updated version of the Jimmy Stewart film Harvey (1950). He added the script "eschews cheap laughs for character-driven humanist comedy, and is sensitively directed by Craig Gillespie."

Alissa Simon of Variety stated, "Craig Gillespie's sweetly off-kilter film plays like a Coen brothers riff on Garrison Keillor's Lake Wobegon tales, defying its lurid premise with a gentle comic drama grounded in reality ... what's fresh and charming is the way the characters surrounding the protagonist also grow as they help him through his crisis."

The film has received favorable reviews from Christian faith-based media, and has been recommended as an instructional tool and a means for opening a dialogue on tolerance.

Accolades

References

External links

 
 

2007 films
2000s English-language films
English-language Canadian films
2007 comedy-drama films
American comedy-drama films
Films set in Wisconsin
Films shot in Toronto
Metro-Goldwyn-Mayer films
Films directed by Craig Gillespie
Sidney Kimmel Entertainment films
Films produced by Sidney Kimmel
Mannequins in films
Canadian comedy-drama films
Films about brothers
2000s American films
2000s Canadian films